Matt Graham is a specialist in "primitive skills".   He is also a television personality who co-hosted the Discovery Channel reality show Dual Survival, and also Dude, you're screwed.

Career
Graham is a co-host of the Discovery Channel reality television show Dude, You're Screwed. He also co-hosted the survival show Dual Survival for the latter part of season 4, and all of seasons 5 and 6 opposite special operations veteran Joe Teti.

In 2016 Graham joined the cast of National Geographic Channel's Live Free or Die.

Filmography

References

External links
 

Living people
Survivalists
People from South Dakota
American television personalities
Male television personalities
1974 births